Eric Klinker is an American technology executive and is best known as the former CEO of BitTorrent. Along with Bram Cohen and three other venture capitalists, he is also on the board of governors of BitTorrent. He was instrumental in formulating BitTorrent's position on network neutrality, testifying before the FCC  as well as other worldwide telecom regulators.

As CEO, he is credited with guiding BitTorrent through the 2008 financial crisis and growing the user base to over 170m users. In 2012, BitTorrent expanded its mission under Klinker and broadened the product portfolio, introducing additional distributed applications like BitTorrent Sync, BitTorrent Bundles, Bleep, and BitTorrent Live, a linear broadcasting P2P protocol also invented by Bram Cohen. In 2014, BitTorrent announced Project Maelstrom, a distributed web browser designed to power a new way for web content to be published, accessed and consumed.

In April 2016, Klinker left BitTorrent to co-found Resilio Inc. with a focus on applying BitTorrent technology to enterprise and IoT markets.

Early life
Raised in Ramsey, Illinois, he is an alumnus of the University of Illinois at Urbana–Champaign and the Naval Postgraduate School.

Career
Before joining BitTorrent, he worked at a number of other companies which included @Home Network, netVmg and  Internap Network Services.

References

External links
 Agenda FCC en banc hearing on Network Management

Living people
American technology chief executives
BitTorrent
Naval Postgraduate School alumni
University of Illinois Urbana-Champaign alumni
People from Ramsey, Illinois
Year of birth missing (living people)